Franklin Academy (FA) is a K–12 public charter school in Wake Forest, North Carolina, United States. It was established in 1998.

References

External links 
 

Wake Forest, North Carolina
Schools in Wake County, North Carolina
Charter schools in North Carolina
Public elementary schools in North Carolina
Public middle schools in North Carolina
Public high schools in North Carolina
Educational institutions established in 1998
1998 establishments in North Carolina